Marcel Antoine Wayne Reece (born June 23, 1985) is an American former football fullback who was the Senior Vice President, Chief of Staff for the Las Vegas Raiders of the National Football League (NFL). He was signed by the Miami Dolphins as an undrafted free agent in 2008. He played college football as a wide receiver at Washington. He has also been a member of the Oakland Raiders and Seattle Seahawks. Reece became an executive with the Las Vegas Raiders in 2020.

High school and college
Reece attended Hesperia High School in Hesperia, California, where he was a first-team All-league performer in football, basketball and track. In football, he earned All-league honors as a wide receiver. He continued his playing career at Chaffey College where he posted 25 receptions for 600 yards and 7 touchdowns. Reece decided to transfer to El Camino College the following year where he posted 47 catches for 1,286 yards and 13 touchdowns. This performance earned him a scholarship to the University of Washington. He broke out during his senior year and made 39 catches for 761 yards and 8 touchdowns. The most notable play of Reece's career came against the University of Arizona where he had a 98-yard reception for a touchdown, which is the longest play from scrimmage in UW history. He also became a member of the Omega Psi Phi fraternity.

In track & field, Reece competed as a sprinter while at Hesperia, earning All-league honors. He recorded a personal-best time of 49.8 seconds in the 400-meter dash as a senior. In addition, he also recorded a 4.45-second 40-yard dash, bench-pressed 360 pounds and had a 34-inch vertical.

Professional career

Despite posting a 4.4-second 40-yard dash, Reece was not drafted. He was noted as a "tweener" scouts did not know what position would fit Marcel in the NFL. He was noted as being too big to be a receiver and too small to be a tight end.

Miami Dolphins
He was signed by the Miami Dolphins as an undrafted free agent in 2008. That same year, he was later cut after not making the final squad.

Oakland Raiders
The Raiders picked him up and experimented with him in a variety of positions and in this process found that fullback fit him best. Reece spent the entire 2008 season and the majority of the 2009 campaign on the Raiders’ practice squad.

In the 2010 NFL season, he emerged as the starting fullback for the Oakland Raiders, hauling in 25 receptions for 333 yards and 3 touchdowns while rushing for 122 yards and one touchdown. He blocked for his teammate running back Darren McFadden, who rushed for 1,157 yards and 7 touchdowns.

In 2012, after a series of injuries to McFadden and back-up Mike Goodson, Marcel Reece was switched from fullback to running back.  He rushed for a total of 271 yards and recorded 52 receptions for 496 yards and one touchdown.

In 2013, both McFadden and back-up Rashad Jennings were limited due to injures, allowing Reece to line up at running back. On December 27, 2013, he was the lone Raider selected for the 2013 Pro Bowl, his second Pro Bowl nomination.

On December 23, 2014, Reece was selected once again to the Pro Bowl, marking his third straight Pro Bowl appearance at the fullback position.

In 2015, after Derek Carr suffered an injury to his throwing hand, Matt McGloin stepped in at quarterback, finding Reece for two receiving touchdowns, in a season-opening loss to the Cincinnati Bengals. On December 22, 2015, he was selected to his fourth straight Pro Bowl. On December 28, 2015, Reece was suspended for four games for violating league policy on performance-enhancing substances.

Reece was released by the Raiders on September 26, 2016.

Seattle Seahawks
On December 6, 2016, Reece was signed by the Seattle Seahawks.

On July 28, 2017, Reece was re-signed by the Seahawks. He was released on September 2, 2017.

Career statistics

Return to the Raiders
On September 11, 2020, the Las Vegas Raiders announced Reece's return in an executive position, with the newly created title of Senior Advisor to the Owner and President for Mark Davis and Marc Badain. Less than two years later, Reece was promoted to Chief People Officer and then around May 21, 2022 Reece became Raiders' Senior Vice President, Chief of Staff.

References

External links

Oakland Raiders bio 
Washington Huskies bio

1985 births
Living people
People from Hesperia, California
Players of American football from California
American football wide receivers
American football fullbacks
Washington Huskies football players
Miami Dolphins players
Oakland Raiders players
Seattle Seahawks players
Sportspeople from San Bernardino County, California
American Conference Pro Bowl players
Unconferenced Pro Bowl players
Las Vegas Raiders executives